Penguins are vulnerable to exposure to oil spills due to their site fidelity, aquatic lifestyle and near-surface foraging habits. Across their range, penguins have been impacted by chronic and acute oil pollution at sea. The following list includes examples of events where impacts to penguins were documented. It is not exhaustive.

References 

Oil spills
Penguins
Environmental disasters